The 2015 Florida Cup was a friendly association football tournament. It was the first tournament played in the United States.

Teams

Venues

Matches

Tables

Teams

Countries

References

External links 
 

Florida Cup (soccer)
Florida Cup 2015
Florida Cup